Lawrence (Lawrie) Minson (born 13 September 1958) is an Australian country musician, best known as a session player.

Career
Minson is the son of former Australian radio personality John Minson. His country music career commenced in 1979 accompanying Buddy Williams on tour as a guitarist. Since then, Minson has performed as part of the Lee Kernaghan touring band and accompanied various other Australian acts. In 1989, Minson contributed "When the Rain Tumbles Down in July" and "Murrumbidgee Jack", as a tribute to Tex Morton, on an instrumental record album of Australian classics. He married Shelley Watts in 2008. Together, they have performed as a rockabilly duo. In 2012, Minson's debut as a headline act was at an Australian Italian club in Launceston, Tasmania.

In 2016, Tamworth Songwriters' Association presented Minson with the Tex Morton Award for his support and promotion of new songwriters.

Discography

Albums

Charting singles

Awards

CMAA Awards
These annual awards have been presented since 1973 and have been organised by Country Music Association of Australia (CMAA) from 1993, to "encourage, promote and recognise excellence in Australian country music recording". From that time, the recipient's trophy has been a Golden Guitar.
 (wins only)
|-
| 1990
| "Wild River"
| Instrumental of the Year
| 
|-
| 1997
| "Action Jackson"
| Instrumental of the Year
|

Tamworth Songwriters Awards
The Tamworth Songwriters Association (TSA) is an annual songwriting contest for original country songs, awarded in January at the Tamworth Country Music Festival. They commenced in 1986.
 (wins only)
|-
| 2016
| Lawrie Minson 
| Tex Morton Award
| 
|-

References

1958 births
Australian musicians
Living people